Lambridge Mill also known as Lambrigg Mill is a wind pump located in the parish of Sea Palling within the Norfolk Broads National Park, United Kingdom and can be found at grid reference , it is approximately 2 miles southwest of Waxham. The wind pump is a grade II listed building.

The current wind pump at this location was built c. 1865 and it fell out of use around 1937. The Mill was built to drain the nearby Long Gore Marsh (located to the south of the mill) along with the Brograve Levels as a helper mill for its much older neighbour Brograve Mill. Both this mill and Brograve Mill drained the levels into the Waxham New Cut via the same drainage channel.

The name of the mill is also somewhat disputed, as the current Ordnance Survey Explorer map states the name of the mill as Lambrigg Mill. The name Lambridge, however, corresponds with the name of the nearby Lambridge Mill Farm and Lambridge Mill Cottage.

The mill still stands today in a derelict state with only two of the original four stocks remaining, these being precariously perched on top of the brickwork attached to the exposed iron windshaft. Only a small rotten section of the original cap remains.

It is difficult to directly reach the mill due to it being located within the private garden of Lambridge Mill Cottage; no public rights of way run nearby. However, it is possible to get relatively close to the structure via the Waxham New Cut, the mill is well beyond the limit of navigation, therefore only small non-motorised craft may venture this far up the river.

References

Windmills in Norfolk
Windmills of the Norfolk Broads
Tower mills in the United Kingdom
North Norfolk
Grade II listed windmills
Grade II listed buildings in Norfolk